The 2000–01 Nemzeti Bajnokság I is the 50th season of the Nemzeti Bajnokság I, Hungary's premier Handball league.

Team information 

The following 12 clubs compete in the NB I during the 2000–01 season:

Regular season (Alapszakasz) 

Pld - Played; W - Won; D - Drawn; L - Lost; GF - Goals for; GA - Goals against; Diff - Difference; Pts - Points.

1 Since Herz-FTC, winners of 2000–01 Magyar Kupa, was qualified for the 2001-02 EHF Champions League, losing cup finalists DVSC-Valdor earned a spot in the third round of the 2001-02 EHF Cup Winners' Cup.

Season statistics

Top goalscorers

Number of teams by counties

Sources 
magyar bajnokságok - kezitortenelem.hu 

Nemzeti Bajnoksag
Nemzeti Bajnoksag
Hungary
Handball leagues in Hungary
2000 in women's handball
1999 in women's handball